Dominique Jamaar Edison (born July 16, 1986) is a former American football wide receiver. He was drafted by the Tennessee Titans in the sixth round of the 2009 NFL Draft. He played college football at Stephen F. Austin State University.

He was also a member of the Seattle Seahawks, Dallas Cowboys, Houston Texans and Edmonton Eskimos.

College career 
Edison played for the Stephen F. Austin State University Lumberjacks. At Stephen F. Austin, Edison caught 179 balls over four years, including 27 touchdowns. In 2008, Edison caught 64 passes for 1,018 yards and 18 touchdowns in 11 games. He was ranked among the top five receivers nationally and statistically in the nation, He also tied with fellow Texan and former OSU receiver Dez Bryant of the Dallas Cowboys for touchdown receptions. He holds receiving records at SFASU for touchdowns in a season, touchdown catches, and receptions. He also holds the school record in the forty-yard dash at 4.32 seconds. He chose Stephen F. Austin over LSU, Texas Tech, and Missouri. He was considered a sleeper prospect for the 2009 NFL Draft and was invited to the NFL Combine.

Professional career

2009 NFL Draft 
The Tennessee Titans chose Edison with the 206th overall pick of the 2009 NFL Draft.

Tennessee Titans
Edison was the 206th overall pick in the 2009 NFL Draft. In 2010, the Tennessee Titans released Edison.

Seattle Seahawks
Edison signed with the Seattle Seahawks after being released by the Titans. He was waived on August 6, 2011.

Dallas Cowboys
Edison was claimed off waivers by the Dallas Cowboys the same day he was released by Seattle. He was waived/injured on August 16, 2011, and later released with an injury settlement on August 24.

Houston Texans
In mid September, Edison sign with the Houston Texans. He was waived a month later after injuring his knee once again.

Carolina Panthers
May 12, 2012, Dominique Edison entered minicamp with the Carolina Panthers but did not make it to camp with the team.

Edmonton Eskimo
Dominique Edison sign with Edmonton Eskimo August 13, 2013, and was later cut August 28, 2013.

Personal life 
Dominique Edison grew up in San Augustine, Texas. As a youth, he was highly involved in church, where he served as an usher.  In junior high school, he was a running back and defensive back. In his high school career, he participated in basketball where he was a three-time all-state and all-district letterwinner, and was heavily recruited by top Division-I programs.  In baseball, he was also a three-time letterwinner and all-district outfielder.  His senior year in high school would prove to be his best as he guided his football team to a state championship against current Washington Redskins quarterback Colt McCoy and the Jim Ned Indians in the 2003 football season.  He was also named to the first-team golden triangle squad, along with fellow running back Tydrick Davis and quarterback Brandon Sharp. In track and field he won the state title in the 200 meter dash with a time of 21.9 seconds, In college, he was a volunteer member and mentor to young kids.

References

1986 births
Living people
American football wide receivers
Dallas Cowboys players
Edmonton Elks players
Seattle Seahawks players
Stephen F. Austin Lumberjacks football players
Tennessee Titans players
People from San Augustine, Texas
Players of American football from Texas